Kastros is an early Neolithic settlement in Cyprus.

Location
It lies at the north-easternmost tip of the Karpasia Peninsula (Cape Apostolos Andreas), about 4 km north of Apostolos Andreas Monastery. The settlement is situated on a little plateau at the steep flank of the limestone promontory, about halfway between the main plateau of the peninsula and the sea in a very inaccessible situation.

History of excavations
Between 1970 and 1973 three campaigns of excavations have been conducted by a French team headed by Alain Le Brun.
The excavation was interrupted by the 1974 war in Cyprus. Today, the structures remain open to the sky and are slowly eroding.

Houses
The settlement consists of small round or roundish houses. Their diameter is between 2.5 and 2.8 m, which gives a living surface of between 5 and 6.8 m2. The houses contain a hearth and sometimes container-bins in the floor. The walls are thin, composed of a single course of dry stone walling. Sometimes several of these are arranged around a common courtyard or stand on small platforms levelled into the hillside. 
Only one house has a more substantial wall (1.70 m thick) and the excavator thinks it might have had a function different from the rest of the structures.

Other structures
There are some small pits filled with charcoal and burned stones. It is believed they may have been used to prepare food or to smoke meat, in the manner of the Polynesian pit ovens or the Irish fulachtaí fia.

Burials
One burial was discovered in a shallow trapezoidal pit measuring 0.75x0.45 m. The body lay on the back, with flexed legs, the head to the northeast, the face turned to the southeast. This type of burial is known from Khirokitia as well (group II). The burial was situated near a house, but at the outside, in contrast to Khirokitia, were all burials are situated inside the houses.
The grave contained four small shells with drilled holes and one dentalium shell.

Dating
The site belongs to the aceramic Neolithic (PPN B) and dates to the 6th Millennium BC.
There are three radiocarbon dates from the site (uncalibrated):

Finds
The houses contain querns. Further finds include stone-vessels (shallow bowls and pots) and flint tools made from local flint from the Pentadaktylos mountains.

Economy
The carbonised remains of einkorn, emmer and  some barley have been found. The relatively high proportion of rye-grass (Lolium sp.) has led van Zeist to suppose that it might not have been a weed, but grown as a crop. Among the pulses, lentils dominate, but peas, vetch and bitter vetch are represented as well. Pistachio, figs and olives, all of them wild forms, were part of the nutrition too.

Sources
A. Le Brun, Cap Andreas – Kastros (Chypre). "Quelques resultats de la campagne de 1973." Paléorient 3, 1975/77, 305–310.
 Julie Hansen, "Ancient Neolithic plant remains in Cyprus: Clues to their origins?" In: S. Swiny, The earliest prehistory of Cyprus. From Colonization to exploitation. Cyprus American archaeological research institute Monograph Series 2 (Boston American School of oriental research 2001), 119–128.

Archaeological sites in Cyprus
Former populated places in Cyprus